Erik de Bruin (born 25 May 1963 in Hardinxveld-Giessendam, South Holland) is a retired Dutch discus thrower and shot putter. He held the Dutch national record in shot put from 1986 to 2005, and his 68.12 m discus throw record of 1 April 1991 still stands today.

Athletic career

De Bruin was Holland's leading discus thrower and shot putter in the 1980s and early 1990s. He participated in the 1984 and 1988 Summer Olympics, reaching 8th places at the 1984 shot put, and 9th place at the 1988 discus throw event. He was most successful in discus throw, winning silver medals at the 1989 Summer Universiade and 1990 European Championships, and a silver medal at the 1991 World Championships.

De Bruin failed a sports drug test in 1993 but was cleared by the disciplinary committee of the Dutch Athletics Federation (KNAU). The International Association of Athletics Federations did not accept the ruling and banned de Bruin for four years. His wife's later book maintained that finances prevented de Bruin from appealing the conviction and ban fully to prove his innocence.

Personal life
De Bruin married Irish swimmer Michelle Smith in 1996. They live with their two children in Kells, Ireland, where Michelle practices as a barrister. Michelle won four Olympic medals at the 1996 Summer Olympics while being trained by Erik; she was banned from competitive swimming by FINA in 1998.

Erik's younger sister Corrie de Bruin is a former Olympic discus thrower.

Achievements

1990:  European Championship – silver – 64,46 m  
1991:  World    Championship – silver – 65,82 m

References

External links 
 

1963 births
Living people
Dutch male shot putters
Dutch male discus throwers
Olympic athletes of the Netherlands
Athletes (track and field) at the 1984 Summer Olympics
Athletes (track and field) at the 1988 Summer Olympics
Dutch sportspeople in doping cases
Doping cases in athletics
People from Hardinxveld-Giessendam
World Athletics Championships medalists
European Athletics Championships medalists
Universiade medalists in athletics (track and field)
Universiade silver medalists for the Netherlands
Medalists at the 1989 Summer Universiade
Sportspeople from South Holland